The 2013 Mountain West Conference football season was the 15th season of college football for the Mountain West Conference (MW). In the 2013 NCAA Division I FBS football season, the MW had 12 football members: Air Force, Boise State, Colorado State, Fresno State, Hawaiʻi, Nevada, New Mexico, San Diego State, San Jose State, UNLV, Utah State, and Wyoming.

This was the third consecutive year in which the Mountain West saw changes in membership. In 2011, two of the conference's charter members, BYU (WCC and football independent) and Utah (Pac-12), left, while Boise State joined from the WAC. The following year, the MW lost TCU, members since 2005, to the Big 12, while gaining new all-sports members Fresno State and Nevada and football-only member Hawaii from the WAC. For 2013, the MW lost no schools, while adding two new full members from the WAC in San Jose State and Utah State. This brought the conference membership in football to 12, allowing the MW to split into divisions and launch a championship game.

Previous season

Preseason

Award watch lists
The following Mountain West players were named to preseason award watch lists.

Maxwell Award:

Chuck Bednarik Award:

John Mackey Award:

Fred Biletnikoff Award:

Bronko Nagurski Trophy:

Outland Trophy:

Jim Thorpe Award:

Lombardi Award:

Rimington Trophy:

Davey O'Brien Award:

Doak Walker Award:

Walter Camp Award:

Lott Trophy:

Lou Groza Award:

Mountain West media days

Media poll

All–Conference Team

Offense

Defense

Coaches
NOTE: Stats shown are before the beginning of the season

*first year as conference member, ^achieved as head coach of New Mexico from 99–08

Rankings

Mountain West vs. BCS matchups

Bowl games
The Mountain West Conference will have agreements with the following bowls for 2012–13:
 The MW champion will receive an automatic berth in one of the five BCS bowl games if they are the highest ranked non-automatic qualifying conference champion and either of the following:
 Ranked in the top 12 of the BCS Rankings. (Utah qualified under this criterion in 2004-05 and 2008–09, and TCU in 2009-10 and 2010–11.)
 Ranked in the top 16 of the BCS Rankings and its ranking is higher than that of an automatic qualifying conference champion.

Regular season

All dates, times, and TV are tentative and subject to change.

The Mountain West has teams in 3 different time zones. Times reflect start time in respective time zone of each team (Mountain—Air Force, Boise State, Colorado State, New Mexico, Wyoming; Pacific—Fresno State, Nevada, San Diego State, UNLV; Hawaii-Aleutian—Hawaiʻi). Conference games start times are that of the home team.

Home attendance

References